Cartoon Network, an American TV channel which launched in 1992, and Adult Swim, its adult-oriented nighttime programming block which launched in 2001, has regularly featured lesbian, gay, bisexual, and transgender (LGBT) characters in its programming.

In the 2010s, Cartoon Network featured multiple cartoons whose main characters expressed their identity and were featured in LGBT-focused storylines. These characters include Garnet, Pearl, and Princess Bubblegum. The network hosted shows which were said to be "strong champions for LGBT representation," such as Adventure Time and Steven Universe. This representation was difficult to achieve, as Rebecca Sugar, the creator of Steven Universe, was told by executives that the inclusion of a central queer romance could have ended her show. At the time the iconic wedding episode of Steven Universe was first drafted, gay marriage was not yet legal in most of the United States.

The role of Cartoon Network shows in LGBTQ representation continued in the 2020s, with the airing of Steven Universe Future on the network and Adventure Time: Distant Lands streaming on HBO Max, along with characters in DC Super Hero Girls. Other shows with LGBTQ characters were OK K.O.!: Let's Be Heroes and Craig of the Creek. In December 2020, Amy Friedman, head of programming for Cartoon Network and HBO Max Kids & Family, stated that they are looking "at ourselves across the inclusion and equity spectrum," including the LGBTQ+ community, to evaluate projects in production, development, and post-greenlighting.

Comparison to other networks 

Some reviewers argue that, when Disney and Cartoon Network are compared, it is "easy to see who actually cares about LGBT representation," noting that for shows on Cartoon Network, "LGBT characters aren't centered around their sexuality."

For instance, the Disney Channel has struggled with LGBTQ representation in their animated series, and their content has often included LGBT stereotypes, one example being queer-coded characters in Beauty and the Beast, Aladdin, and Mulan. However, the animated series The Owl House is a newer series by Disney that is a positive example of the company incorporating LGBTQ+ representation into their shows. The series, which began in 2020, concerns protagonist Luz Noceda, a 14-year-old Dominican-American girl who makes history as Disney’s first openly bisexual protagonist.

1990s

In the 1990s, queer coded characters appeared in various Cartoon Network series, such as Space Ghost Coast to Coast, Mission Hill, episodes of Dexter's Laboratory and Cow and Chicken.

Space Ghost Coast to Coast, which aired on Cartoon Network (1994-1999; 2001); Adult Swim (2001-2004), and GameTap (2006-2008), included a gay character. On December 25, 1994, Lokar, a locust alien and member of the Council of Doom, was introduced in the Space Ghost Coast to Coast Christmas special A Space Ghost Christmas. Supplementary material for the series had Lokar referred to himself as a Confirmed bachelor while an article on the official Cartoon Network website featured a reference to a slang word for gay sex. His sexuality was confirmed in audio commentaries for the Space Ghost Coast to Coast Volume 2 DVD and it was revealed that Lokar died at some point during the series. However this was eventually contradicted when Lokar returned in the Season 11 episode "Stephen" in where he is shown to be alive and well.

On May 18, 1996, Silver Spooner, the sidekick to Barbequor, appeared in an episode of Dexter's Laboratory titled "Dial M for Monkey: Barbequor." Both characters are parodies of Silver Surfer and Galactus, with the episode banned. While some said this was because Silver Spooner was a stereotype of gay men, with complaints to that effect after it aired, others said it had more to do with copyright infringement as the estate of Jack Kirby threatened to sue Cartoon Network over the parody character. The episode was, in later broadcasts, and on its Season 1 DVD (Region 1), replaced with "Dexter's Lab: A Story", an episode from season two.

The now-banned Cow and Chicken episode "Buffalo Gals" aired on June 27, 1998. It only aired once, as frequent complaints prevented future airings. Complaints were made about its overt innuendos, frequent double entendres, and lesbian stereotypes. It no longer airs on television and has been replaced in future reruns with "Orthodontic Police."

Mission Hill aired on The WB from 1999 to 2000 and Adult Swim in 2002. It featured Gus Duncz and Wally Langford, a gay elderly couple in their late 60s. As a result the series won an award from GLAAD for this representation, with some arguing that the series was "prematurely axed."

2000s

In the 2000s, queer coded characters appeared in series such as The Oblongs, Courage the Cowardly Dog, Time Squad, and  The Grim Adventures of Billy & Mandy. However, other shows featured out characters, like a lesbian character in Moral Orel, and various characters in The Venture Bros. and Superjail!.

The Oblongs, which aired from 2001 to 2002, features Biff who is implied to be gay. He was confirmed to be gay in a bonus feature from The Oblongs Complete Series DVD.

Courage the Cowardly Dog featured Lieutenant Gidley and General Horton. Gidley and Horton both appeared in episodes from 2001 to 2002, and in the 2021 crossover film, Straight Outta Nowhere: Scooby-Doo! Meets Courage the Cowardly Dog. In May 2019, the series creator, John Dilworth stated that both characters were in a gay relationship. Additionally, the Courage the Cowardly Dog episode "The Mask", on October 18, 2002, featured two characters Kitty and Bunny. The characters were implied to be in a relationship. This was confirmed by series creator John R. Dilworth.

Time Squad which aired from 2001 to 2003 on Cartoon Network, arguably had a gay character. In 2012, the voice actor of Larry 3000, Mark Hamill, implied that Larry could easily have been interpreted as gay, due to his femininity and presentation as the "gay best friend" to Cleopatra in "Shop like an Egyptian", even though Larry has stated on multiple occasions he dislikes humans in general. However, the show never directly stated his sexuality. Even so, Hamill described Larry 3000 as "fierce" and "flamboyant."

A lesbian character appeared in Moral Orel, which aired on Adult Swim from December 13, 2005 to December 18, 2008. Stephanie Foamwire-Putty is a lesbian character in Moral Orel who's revealed to have fallen in unrequited love with her old high school best friend, Kim Latchkey.
The series also featured, Coach Daniel Stopframe, Orel's bisexual coach as well as Shapey's biological father, Daniel lusts after their father, Clay, and at one point has sex with three women and a dog in episodes like "The Blessed Union."

Superjail! aired from 2008 to 2014 on Adult Swim. In the series. Jean Baptiste Le Ghei and Paul Guaye are inmates and a recurring couple as shown in the Superjail! episode "Superbar" and others. In an interview with the creators of the show, co-creator Christy Karacas called them well-rounded characters, who are a couple, with Paul as more feminine and intelligent than Jean who is "the bad boy." The series also featured Alice, a hulking and muscular head prison guard of Superjail and a trans woman who regularly engages in sadomasochistic rituals with the prisoners, and rebuffs The Warden's constant advances as shown in episodes like "Jailbot 2.0." Alice was originally a male prison guard, but discovered her true self after falling in love with a homosexual warden.

2010s

In the 2010s, more LGBTQ characters began appearing in Cartoon Network series, with fewer of them being coded like in previous years, apart from some characters in Scooby Doo! Mystery Incorporated, Steven Universe, DreamWorks Dragons, Mike Tyson Mysteries. Series with outward characters included Steven Universe, DreamWorks Dragons, Adventure Time, The Boondocks, Clarence, OK K.O.! Let's Be Heroes, Transformers: Cyberverse, Steven Universe Future.

From 2010 to 2013, Scooby Doo! Mystery Incorporated aired on Cartoon Network. In July 2020, Tony Cervone, a producer of Scooby Doo! Mystery Incorporated stated that Velma Dinkley was a lesbian. James Gunn, who wrote the screenplays of Scooby-Doo and Scooby-Doo 2: Monsters Unleashed, concurred, stating that Velma was "explicitly gay." She has feelings for another woman, Marcie "Hot Dog Water" Fleach.

From its beginning in November 2010, Young Justice has included many LGBTQ characters. In September 2012, Young Justice writer, Greg Weisman, confirmed Marie Logan as lesbian or bisexual in September 2012. In July 2019, Weisman confirmed Kaldur'ahm as polysexual. Weisman also confirmed Wyynde as a gay character.

The series introduced Harper Row in July 2019. She is a bisexual friend to Violet Harper and Fred Bugg. 2019 also saw the introduction of Violet Harper, in the third season of Young Justice. They questioned their gender identity in the episode "Influence". Halo comes out as non-binary in season 4 and starts switching to they/them pronouns.

Journalists for Insider said that Eduardo "Ed" Dorado Jr in Young Justice was gay in June 2021. This was confirmed by Greg Weisman in July 2021. In March 2022, Lagoon Boy was revealed to be bisexual as he is in a three-way polyamorous relationship with a man and a woman.

In June 2022, Greg Weisman confirmed that Rosa in Young Justice is transgender when he retweeted from a fan. Rosa is voiced by transgender actress Quei Tann.

The first two seasons of DreamWorks Dragons aired on Cartoon Network from 2012 to 2014, and from 2015-2018 aired on Netflix. In February 2019, Gobber, the blacksmith of Berk, Stoick's closest friend, who appears in the films of the How to Train Your Dragon and DreamWorks Dragons: Rescue Riders was confirmed as gay

In the episode "Jeff Wins" of Clarence, on December 4, 2014, EJ Randell and Sue Randell were introduced as Jeff's mothers.

In a 2015 episode of The Boondocks, many gay characters appeared, including Gangstalicious, a closet homosexual who goes to great lengths to keep his identity as a gay man hidden from the public. Marquess of Queensbury, appeared on Mike Tyson Mysteries, which started on October 27, 2014. Eric Thurm of The A.V. Club argued that Marquess was a gay character and he was based on a man named John Douglas, the 9th Marquess of Queensberry.

In December 2018,Transformers: Cyberverse writer Mae Catt confirmed that the character Acid Storm was genderqueer, saying they like to switch between male and female genders.

The series Victor and Valentino, which ran from March 2019 to August 2022, features Xochi Jalapeño, a lesbian character. Xochi is Don Jalapeño's rebellious teenage daughter who sometimes babysits the protagonists, has a crush on her friend, Amabel as shown in the episodes "Band for Life," "Escaramuza," and "Carmelita."

In the August 19, 2019 Final Space episode "The Closer You Get," the character Tribore tells another character, Shannon, that "he is in love with his other half", because his species flips gender twice a year. Ajay Aravind, writing for Screen Rant, calls this "an amazing non-binary bit of the episode". Series creator Olan Rogers later described Tribore as "narcissi-sexual" because he "loves himself a little too much."

2020s

Various Cartoon Network series which aired in the 2020s include LGBTQ characters, including those currently airing. Series such as Adventure Time: Distant Lands, Final Space, DC Superhero Girls that ended, included such characters, along with more subtle hints at queer identities in Elliott from Earth and Ben 10.

In June 2020, the first episode of Adventure Time: Distant Lands series, the name for four hour-long streaming television specials based on Adventure Time, began streaming on HBO Max, and it introduced Y5, an anthropomorphic rabbit and teenage scientist between age 11 and 13 who lives in The Drift. Originally named "Y4", Y5 chooses her new name with BMO's encouragement and eventually becomes the robot's "deputy." Y5 struggles with managing the expectations of her parents (voiced by Tom Kenny and Michelle Wong, respectively), and finds herself forced to disobey them in order to save the Drift—all the while discovering her own identity. Y5—with the titular robot's assistance—helps the citizens of the Drift defeat Hugo, and after their overlord is dethroned, she proposes a new form of social organization based on cooperation that will ideally allow the Drift to flourish. Voice actress Glory Curda later argued that Y5's story has a lot of context and is representative of coming out into your own identity and defining yourself with whatever terms are comfortable for you. Curda, in a Q&A on Reddit, said that after BMO left, Y5 grew and developed into "a leader and trailblazer to help save the drift," and noted that she was a big Adventure Time fan before getting the part. In February 2021 it was announced that Adventure Time: Distant Lands episode "BMO" had won a Kidscreen Award for Best One-Off, Special or TV Movie. BMO was also, previously, confirmed as a genderfluid character.

The relationship between Marcy and Bonnie would be the main focus of the November 19, 2020 Adventure Time: Distant Lands episode, "Obsidian", Rebecca Long, writing for Polygon, said that the episode gives fans the "emotional payoff and answers" they have been yearning for and that the special uses the plot to explore Marceline's childhood trauma, her romantic history with Bubblegum, how the two are interconnected, and fills in gaps about her past. The episode was nominated for a GLAAD Media Award, taking place in 2021, for Outstanding Kids & Family Programming, praised for using the plot to explore Marceline's childhood trauma, her romantic history with Bubblegum, how the two are interconnected, and for giving  Marceline and Princess Bubblegum a "shared future that feels real." Rosie Knight of IGN wrote that the special was a "perfect example of why [Adventure Time] made such a huge impact" and called it "a fitting addition to Adventure Times legacy." Petrana Radulovic of Polygon argued that Obsidian was a "perfect end to this big gay year in animation," while noting that there is still work to do going forward. Princess Weekes of The Mary Sue, before the episode aired, said she found it reassuring because for queer representation "it is important to acknowledge that loving someone doesn't fix emotional issues or personality flaws."

In April 2020,  co-creator Duncan Rouleau confirmed Rojo is a lesbian. He noted that she was in a relationship with fellow gang member Azul. In the short-lived series Elliott from Earth, which aired from March to April 2021, the main character Elliott lives with his single mother Frankie. In "Wednesday Part 2", Frankie tells Elliott that "your mother and I" were planning to call him Maureen when they thought he was a girl, revealing that she is a lesbian. Additionally, in the episode "Wednesday Part 4", a male alien mentions his husband.

The DC Super Hero Girls episode #HousePest, on April 17, 2020, featured the two mothers of Jessica Cruz, also known as Green Lantern. When asked about this by Taimur Gur of ComicsBeat, series creator Lauren Faust said that everyone was "on board with this idea" and that she was glad it was approved.

In March 2020, Peridot, a popular character in Steven Universe, was confirmed by storyboarder Maya Peterson as asexual and aromantic. She said this despite her reservations that she is only a secondary creator on the show, pleasing fans. However, she said that she didn't believe Peridot was autistic. However, before, and after this point, fans had shipped Peridot with various other characters, specifically Lapis Lazuli and Amethyst, with some reviewers seeing Peridot and Lapis in a "close, loving relationship."

In 2020, the creator of Final Space, Olan Rogers, told fans in 2020 that he always saw Clarence as bisexual. Clarence, a recurring character, has an ex-wife, several since-deceased wives, two adopted children (Fox and Ash Graven), is implied to be in love with General Cataloupe, and has unrequited love on Sheryl Goodspeed. One reviewer argued that the death of Clarence was not unique because "over 50 characters have died during the course of the series." In the Final Space episode, "Forgiveness," on May 8, 2021, Ash Graven meets a genderless being named Evra, voiced by Jasmin Savoy Brown. Evra becomes Ash's friend and helps her "take her anger out," with both sitting and watching a formation of lights like the aurora borealis together. Her relationship with Evra makes clear her sexual orientation as a lesbian woman, in addition to being angry at a man named Jordan Hammerstein, in the episode "Arachnitects," for rejecting her at prom. Rogers, in a podcast about the episode "Forgiveness" that David Sacks, who wrote the episode, came from a place of "two souls connecting to each other" and noted that if the show had fourth season, they would have expand on the relationship between Evra and Ash.

However, the series, which aired on Adult Swim, was cancelled on September 10, 2021, before it could ever happen. One reviewer argued that having Ash as a lesbian character was "one of the best representations of LGBTQ characters in mature animation for some time," as shown in the episode "Forgiveness," and saying she is a lesbian, not "ambiguously bi."The reviewer also noted that Ash, even as an antagonist, does not "fulfill common stereotypes or tropes," comparing her experience to the manipulation of Cassandra in the final season of Tangled by Zhan Tiri, saying both are complex characters who experience trauma and have "troubled pasts," with Invictus exploiting Ash's Trauma triggers. The review ends by noting Ash's development through the series, with Evra helping her grow, and hoping the series would "move forward mature animation in a better and more inclusive direction" if there was another season.

Tuca & Bertie included a bisexual character Tuca Toucan. In season 2, Tuca was in a same-sex relationship with Kara, a seagull, but they broke up. The series was cancelled after two seasons. Tuca and Bertie was originally released on Netflix and was cancelled after one season.

Currently airing series
A few currently airing Cartoon Network series have LGBTQ characters, specifically Rick and Morty, Craig of the Creek, Summer Camp Island.

Pansexual characters were implied in Rick and Morty. The season five Rick and Morty episode "Mort Dinner Rick Andre" confirmed that the father of Morty, Jerry Smith, is queer because he, and Beth, his wife, have a threesome with the King of the Ocean, otherwise known as Mr. Nimbus. Jerry has feelings for Mr. Nimbus, and due to the fact he has a wife, it means he is either pansexual or bisexual, with both he and Beth in a "sex-positive place" in their relationship, according to Jerry's voice actor, Chris Parnell. The fact he is queer was already hinted in the episode "Total Rickall".

Two lesbian characters were confirmed in Craig of the Creek in April 2018. In their debut episode, "The Curse", Tabitha refuses to go to college in favor of spending time with Courtney, who blushes, and they hold hands at the conclusion of the episode. In "The Haunted Dollhouse", they have feelings for each other, which is confirmed, and they kiss.

J.P.'s openly lesbian older sister, in the episode "Jextra Perrestrial" is shown to be in a relationship with a girl named Kat. Laura is voiced by openly lesbian comedian Fortune Feimster. In the episode "Cousin of the Creek", Jasmine tells her cousin "I am texting my girlfriend, mind your business." The season 4 episode "Fire and Ice" focuses on Kelsey and Stacks' relationship as they confessed their love to each other.

Raj and Shawn in Craig of the Creek, Honeysuckle Rangers from a neighborhood nearby, are implied to have feelings for each other in several episodes. Their relationship was eventually confirmed in the season 4 episode "Creek Talent Extravaganza". Raj is voiced by gay actor Parvesh Cheena.

Craig of the Creek confirmed in December 2019 that the show had a non-binary character named Angel José. Their voice actor, Angel Lorenzana, who also uses they/them pronouns, an agender storyboard artist for the show, confirmed this. In later tweets, they added that their "cartoon self" used they/them before themselves, gave a shout out to the show's crew, and said that while this is a small contribution to LGBTQ+ representation, they hope "fans can take comfort knowing that there's also non-binary people working behind the scenes" on every of the show's episodes. Additionally, there is a non-binary character named Merkid who appears as a mermaid in the episode "Beyond the Creek" and cameos in the episode "In the Key of the Creek".

In July 2022, the Craig of the Creek episode "Silver Fist Returns" revealed George to be gay as he reciprocated Secret Keeper's feelings. Secret Keeper is voiced by gay non-binary actor Cole Escola.

Summer Camp Island, which began in September 2018, has various LGBTQ characters. For instance, Ghost the Boy, a ghost and Betsy's ex-boyfriend, has two dads Kent and Cole as his parents, introduced in a July 2018 episode. The series also features Puddle, a non-binary alien who uses they/them pronouns and their husband, Alien King, is the king of their planet.

In November 2022, Bob the Drag Queen guest starred as Ducci Bag in the Craig of the Creek episode "Back to Cool". In 2023, Craig of the Creek is being nominated for a GLAAD Media Award for Outstanding Kids & Family Programming - Animated.

Challenges faced by creators 
Creators of Cartoon Network have occasionally talked faced challenges. In March 2020, Rob Sorcher, chief content officer at Cartoon Network, spoke about the factors that go into content decisions for storylines. One important factor to consider was that Steven Universe aired in nearly 200 countries that had culturally conservative audiences. A common challenge when designing kids animations and cartoons is considering conservative and religious audiences who will often vocalize backlash on non-traditional storylines. Scorcher explained, "On a personal level, as a gay executive, I was taking extra pains to be sure that inside my company, I'm being completely neutral - really listening to all the business issues going on around the world," Sorcher says. "And that there's not the optics of me coming in with an 'agenda' to drive through the content." When Rebecca Sugar originally pitched the Steven Universe episode with a lesbian wedding, "Reunited" she encountered challenges presenting it to the Cartoon Network. Sugar was able to convince network officers that the wedding was organic to the show’s development and a natural progression of Ruby and Sapphire’s relationship. When the wedding episodes—a double episode titled “Reunited”—aired in 2018, network policy progressed. Scorcher noted that it became standard policy for the network to treat homosexual relationships like heterosexual relationships.

In October 2014, Spencer Rothbell, a writer, head of storywriting, and voice actor of multiple characters, for the show Clarence, said that they had to change a scene in the episode "Neighborhood Grill", which showed two gay characters after pushback from Cartoon Network executives. According to Rothbell, the original scene showed the two characters kissing on the lips, noting that "originally the guy had flowers and they kissed on the mouth." Later he lamented that the scene in the episode is "better than nothing," adding that "maybe one day the main character can be gay and it won't be a big deal." Despite this step back, there were some moves forward.

In the summer of 2018, Steven Universe would make headlines with a gay wedding between two characters: Ruby and Sapphire, challenging Cartoon Network's history of "not overtly depicting same-sex marriage" as Sugar struggled to get any LGBTQ+ representation on the show, with the network ultimately accepting her reasoning.

The episode, "Reunited," which aired on July 6, which she and the crew had worked on for years, was praised as an example of the network's frank portrayal of "sexuality and gender identity in children's programming," and it was positively received by the LGBTQ+ community and fans. This episode made Steven Universe the first kid's show on U.S. television to feature a lesbian wedding. The creator of Gravity Falls, Alex Hirsch, believed that because of this episode, it meant that Sugar was moving everyone in kid's programming forward in terms of LGBTQ+ representation. ND Stevenson praised the episode as "bold and courageous," serving as a moment which "knocked down so many walls" for other storytellers.

In September 2018, Bonnie and Marcy kissed in the Adventure Time finale, "Come Along With Me". However, the kiss was not scripted, as series creator Adam Muto admitted. It was only added after a storyboard artist, Hanna K. Nyström, advocated for it. Previously, some of those behind the show played down the relationship. Some reviewers had hoped that "queer cartoon subtext" turns into "a queer cartoon subplot" or even a main plot in the future, and pointed to the Adventure Time Presents Marceline and the Scream Queens comic, created as part of the franchise, as fleshing out this relationship.

See also
 LGBT representation in adult animation
 LGBT representation in animated web series
 List of LGBT-related films by year
 Cross-dressing in film and television
 List of cross-dressing characters in animated series
 List of animated films with LGBT characters
 List of lesbian characters in animation
 List of gay characters in animation
 List of fictional trans characters
 List of fictional intersex characters
 List of fictional non-binary characters
 List of bisexual characters in animation
 List of fictional pansexual characters
 List of fictional asexual characters

Notes

References

Citations

Sources
 
 
 

2010s animated television series
Animated television series
LGBT portrayals in mass media
Cartoon Network